Asaphodes nephelias is a moth in the family Geometridae. It is endemic to New Zealand and has been observed in the South Island. The preferred habitat of this species is alpine tussock grasslands above native forest and in wetlands. The adults of this species are on the wing from January to March and are day flying. The female has brachypterous wings.

Taxonomy
This species was first described in 1883 by Edward Meyrick using specimens collected at Arthur's Pass at 4600 ft in January and named Larentia nephelias. Meyrick gave a fuller description later in 1884. George Hudson discussed the species in his 1898 volume New Zealand moths and butterflies and referred to it as Xanthorhoe nephelias. Hudson discussed and illustrated this species under that name in his 1928 publication The butterflies and moths of New Zealand. In the same publication Hudson synonymised Xanthorhoe subflava with this species. In 1971 J. S. Dugdale placed this species within the genus Asaphodes. In 1988 Dugdale confirmed this placement. The male lectotype is held at the Natural History Museum, London.

Description

Meyrick first described this species as follows:

Meyrick gave a fuller description in 1884 and stated:

The female of this species is brachypterous.

Distribution

This species is endemic to New Zealand and has been collected in Arthur's Pass and Mount Arthur. This species has also been collected in Central Otago including on Ben Lomond, Nevis Valley as well as at Danseys Pass.

Behaviour 
The adults of this species are on the wing from January to March and are day flying.

Habitat 
This species is found in alpine tussock grasslands above native forest. It has also been observed in wetlands in Otago at the Danseys Pass as well as the Nevis Red Tussock Fen.

References 

Moths described in 1883
Moths of New Zealand
Larentiinae
Endemic fauna of New Zealand
Taxa named by Edward Meyrick
Endemic moths of New Zealand